International Copyright Act is a stock short title used for legislation in the United Kingdom and the United States which relates to foreign copyright.

List

United Kingdom
The International Copyright Act 1844 (7 & 8 Vict. c.12)
The International Copyright Act 1852 (15 & 16 Vict. c.12)
The Fine Arts Copyright Act 1862 (25 & 26 Vict. c.68)
The International Copyright Act 1875 (38 & 39 Vict. c.12)
The International Copyright Act 1886 (49 & 50 Vict. c.33)

The International Copyright Acts is the collective title of the International Copyright Act 1844, the International Copyright Act 1852, the Fine Arts Copyright Act 1862, the International Copyright Act 1875, and the International Copyright Act 1886.

United States
The International Copyright Act of 1891

See also
List of short titles

References

Lists of legislation by short title and collective title
Copyright legislation